Ján Gajdošík (born 12 October 1978) is a retired Slovak football defender.

References

External links

Futbalnet profile 
FK Senica profile 

1978 births
Living people
Slovak footballers
Association football defenders
FK Železiarne Podbrezová players
FK Senica players
Slovak Super Liga players
Expatriate footballers in the Czech Republic
Sportspeople from Brezno